Pavel Viktorovich Kudrin (born 20 February 1983) is a former Russian professional football player.

Club career
He played in the Russian Football National League for FC Fakel Voronezh in 2006.

References

1983 births
Living people
Russian footballers
Association football defenders
FC Fakel Voronezh players
FC Rotor Volgograd players